Ronald "Ron" William Thompson Falk (born 23 August 1935 – 27 June 2016) was an Australian actor and production designer. He was perhaps best known as the voice of the Coruscant Diner chef, Dexter Jettster in Star Wars: Episode II – Attack of the Clones. His other works included roles in Jack Irish, Secret City, The Damnation of Harvey McHugh and ITV Play of the Week.

Early life
Falk was born on 23 August 1935 in Geelong, Victoria, Australia. In his early years, he was educated at the Geelong Grammar School.

Career
Falk's acting career began in Melbourne at the Union and National theatre. He played alongside the late Monica Maughan and Barry Humphries in The Front Page and other classical theatre roles.

He soon moved to England where he spent ten years to participate in other theatre productions. He later moved back to Australia where he continued his acting career well into his senior citizen years.

Personal life
Falk took a two-year break from acting to take up painting and piano lessons. He learned to play the blues harmonica for the opera production of Mourning Becomes Electra.

Death
Falk died on 27 June 2016 at the age of 80. His funeral was held 15 July 2016. He is survived by his sister JJ Barwise. As well as his nephews, Ronald and Patrick, his Niece, Ruby, and brother in law, Daniel.

Filmography

References

1935 births
2016 deaths
Australian actors
Musicians from Geelong